Aarhus has many neighborhoods of historic nature, including:

 Midtbyen (or Aarhus C)
 Docklands
 Frederiksbjerg
 Indre by
 Latin Quarter 
 Langenæs
 Trøjborg
 Vesterbro 
 CeresByen
 Øgadekvarteret
 Marselisborg
 Nørre Stenbro

Neighborhoods beyond the Ring 1 ring road include:
 Christiansbjerg
 Fuglebakken
 Hasle
 Bispehaven
 Holme
 Højbjerg
 Risskov
 Viby
 Aabyhøj
 Aaby

Neighborhoods beyond the Ring 2 ring road include:
 Brabrand
 Egå
 Finnebyen
 Gellerup
 Hasselager
 Kolt
 Herredsvang
 Kalenderkvarteret
 Rosenhøj
 Tilst
 Tranbjerg
 Toveshøj
 Vejlby
 Skejby
 Skæring
 Skødstrup
 Skåde
 Slet
 Stavtrup

See also 
 Administrative divisions of Aarhus Municipality

References